Mirond Lake 184E is an Indian reserve of the Peter Ballantyne Cree Nation in Saskatchewan. It is 48 miles northwest of Flin Flon, on the northeast shore of Mirond Lake.

References

Indian reserves in Saskatchewan
Division No. 18, Saskatchewan
Peter Ballantyne Cree Nation